The Mitchell Medal was the best and fairest award for the Fitzroy Football Club in the Australian Football League (AFL).

Percy Mitchell was a long-serving club administrator and life member and the award was named after him in 1987.

Recipients

Multiple winners

References

Australian Football League awards
Fitzroy Football Club
Awards disestablished in 1996
Australian rules football-related lists